The Progress Rail PR43C was a  C-C genset diesel-electric locomotive built by Progress Rail Services Corporation.  It was the result of a conversion of existing EMD SD50 locomotives.  This involved replacing the original EMD 645 prime mover with a pair of Caterpillar engines, a  12 cylinder C175 engine and a  C18 engine. The locomotive was jointly designed by Progress Rail and Norfolk Southern Railway. Development began in 2008.

Three locomotives were built; they were manufactured at Progress Rail's Mayfield, Kentucky factory. Two operated in revenue freight service on Norfolk Southern, while a third operated as a demonstrator unit for Progress Rail. At one time Norfolk Southern had four more PR43Cs on order. The locomotives operated by Norfolk Southern worked on freight trains in central Illinois, leading to speculation that they were being tested, as Caterpillar's headquarters are located in Peoria, Illinois.

The process of converting an SD50 to a PR43C altered the external appearance of the locomotive; the original radiator section was replaced with a larger one similar in appearance to that of an EMD SD70ACe or SD70M-2. 

As a result of repeated failures, the locomotives were retired in 2017, and all were cut up for scrap in 2018.

References

External links

C-C locomotives
Diesel-electric locomotives of the United States
Railway locomotives introduced in 2009
Norfolk Southern Railway locomotives
Rebuilt locomotives
Standard gauge locomotives of the United States